SS Malakand was a cargo liner built in 1919 for the Brocklebank Line. She was the second Brocklebank Line ship named after the Malakand area of the Indian subcontinent.

During World War II, Malakand was loaded with munitions at the Huskisson Dock in Liverpool, England, on the evening of 3 May 1941 during a heavy German air raid – a part of the city's "May Blitz" – when flames from dock sheds that had been bombed spread to her. The fire services could not contain the fire and on 4 May 1941, a few hours after the raid had ended, Malakand exploded, destroying the entire Huskisson No. 2 dock and killing four people. It took seventy-four hours for the fire to burn out.

Although the Malakand explosion is often attributed to a burning barrage balloon, the fire the balloon started was put out before it could affect the ship.

References

Steamships of the United Kingdom
World War II merchant ships of the United Kingdom
Ships built on the River Clyde
Cargo liners
Maritime incidents in May 1941
Ship fires
Ships sunk by non-combat internal explosions
1918 ships